Robert "Bert" L. Farmer (February 27, 1875 – May 31, 1939) was an American politician who served in the California State Assembly and in the Los Angeles City Council. He unsuccessfully challenged George E. Cryer in the 1923 Los Angeles mayoral election.

Early life and career 
Farmer was born on February 27, 1875. He and his family, resided in both San Luis Obispo County and Merced County before he moved to Los Angeles in 1893, where he became an insurance adjuster. In 1903, Farmer was chosen by the Board of Education to become the census marshal. In 1906, he became a city purchasing agent before becoming a deputy city clerk, city schools census marshal, and later the regional supervisor for the 1910 United States census.

Political career 
In November 7, 1916 California State Assembly election, Farmer won the seat for the 71st district over Socialist Party incumbent Lewis A. Spengler, Progressive candidate John H. Martin, and Prohibition candidate James Gillespie. On July 1, 1917, while still serving as an Assemblyman, Farmer won a seat on the Los Angeles City Council.

On January 3, 1918, Farmer was elected by the Council to become the President of the Los Angeles City Council, succeeding James Simpson Conwell. During his one-year tenure, he presided over the renaming of Central Park to Pershing Square, helped with city celebrations for Eddie Rickenbacker, and cooperated with Mayor Frederick T. Woodman to "suppress[...] sedition in Los Angeles."

In 1920, he was a candidate for Los Angeles County Supervisor for the 4th district, but lost  the election. In the 1923 Los Angeles mayoral election, he unsuccessfully challenged incumbent George E. Cryer for the office of Mayor, to which he advocated for a new city charter. In May 1933, he was a candidate for the 73rd State Assembly district, but lost to Howard W. Davis.

Personal life and death 
Farmer was married to Maude Farmer, and the two of them had two children, Ada Carroll and Dorothy Reamer. He became ill during the last three years of his life, dying at his home in Pico Union on May 31, 1939. His funeral was held on June 2, 1939.

References 
Access to the Los Angeles Times links requires the use of a library card.

1875 births
1939 deaths
Presidents of the Los Angeles City Council
Republican Party members of the California State Assembly